Garrowhill ( or) is a residential area within the wider Baillieston suburb of Glasgow, Scotland.

History
Garrowhill was developed as a residential area in the mid-1930s, built as a housing development neighbouring the then village of Baillieston.

Garrowhill was brought within Glasgow's city boundaries in 1975 along with Baillieston, under the terms of the Local Government (Scotland) Act, 1973.

Although sometimes considered separate from Baillieston, Garrowhill along with Swinton, Springhill and Barrachnie falls within the Baillieston Ward of Glasgow City Council.

Schools

The local primary school is Garrowhill Primary School, located on Bakewell Road.  The school is part of the Bannerman Learning Community. Both schools are involved with local charities to combat child poverty, crime, alcohol and drug problems commonly associated with Glasgow's East End.

Transport
Garrowhill is well connected with the city centre by local buses and trains.

Garrowhill is located close to the M8 motorway.

References

External links

Areas of Glasgow
Baillieston